Gangsta Grillz: The Album is the debut album by hip hop disc jockey DJ Drama, bearing the name of his popular Gangsta Grillz mixtape series, that was released on December 4, 2007, by Aphilliates Music Group, Embassy Entertainment, Grand Hustle Records and Atlantic Records.

Singles
The lead single from the album was "5000 Ones". The second single off the album was "The Art of Storytellin' Part 4". Guest appearances include Nelly, T.I., Young Jeezy, Willie the Kid, Lil Jon, Lil Wayne, B.G., La the Darkman, 8Ball & MJG, Lil Boosie, Young Buck, Lloyd Banks, Tony Yayo, Project Pat, Yo Gotti, Rick Ross, Freeway, Yung Joc, Jadakiss, Jim Jones, Big Kuntry King, Webbie, and many others.

Track listing

Charts

Weekly charts

Year-end charts

References

DJ Drama albums
2007 debut albums
Albums produced by the Runners
Albums produced by Jazze Pha
Albums produced by Dame Grease
Albums produced by Nottz
Albums produced by Lil Jon
Albums produced by Mr. Porter
Albums produced by Drumma Boy
Albums produced by Don Cannon
Albums produced by the Neptunes
Atlantic Records albums
Grand Hustle Records albums